Non-religious secular music and sacred music were the two main genres of Western music during the Middle Ages and Renaissance era. The oldest written examples of secular music are songs with Latin lyrics.  However, many secular songs were sung in the vernacular language, unlike the sacred songs that followed the Latin language of the Church.  These earliest types were known as the chanson de geste (song of deeds) and were popular amongst the traveling jongleurs and minstrels of the time.

The largest collection of secular music from this period comes from poems of celebration and chivalry of the troubadours from the south of France. These poems contain clever rhyme-schemes, varied use of refrain-lines or words, and different metric patterns. The minstrels of this time were not themselves poets or composers. Instead they adapted the compositions of others to sing, play, and dance to in their own unique versions.  Other styles included love songs, political satire, dances, chansons, and dramatic works.

According to Grout's A History of Western Music (1996), common musical instruments of this time period included: harps, imported to continental Europe from Ireland and Britain sometime before the ninth century; Vielle, a prototype of the Renaissance viol and modern viola with five strings, one of which was a drone, popular amongst the jongleurs to accompany their singing and recitations; Organistrum, a three-stringed instrument similar to the vielle but played by the turning of a crank, with strings ‘stopped by a set rods instead of the player’s fingers); and Psaltery, a type of zither played by plucking or ‘striking’ the strings, which frequently appears in medieval art. The most common wind instruments included both recorder and transverse style flutes; the reeded Shawms, a precursor to the oboe; trumpets and bagpipes.
    
Drums, harps, recorders, and bagpipes were the instruments of choice when performing secular music due to ease of transportation. Jongleurs and minstrels learned their trade through oral tradition.

Composers like Josquin des Prez wrote sacred and secular music. He composed 86 highly successful secular works and 119 sacred pieces. Secular music also was aided by the formation of literature during the reign of Charlemagne that included a collection of secular and semi-secular songs. Guillaume de Machaut was another example of a leading composer who continued the trouvere tradition.

References

Bibliography
 

Music genres